Raoul du Toit is a Zimbabwean environmentalist. He was awarded the Goldman Environmental Prize in 2011, for his efforts on protection of the black rhino.

In 1990, while working with the World Wildlife Foundation du Toit founded the Lowveld Rhino Conservancy Project. du Toit is now director of the Lowveld Rhino Trust.

References 

Date of birth unknown
Living people
Zimbabwean environmentalists
Year of birth missing (living people)
Goldman Environmental Prize awardees